Amédée Galzin (1 May 1853, Parrinet, Aveyron – 14 February 1925, Parrinet) was a French veterinarian and mycologist.

In 1878 he obtained his degree from the veterinary college in Toulouse. From 1879 to 1905, he served as a military veterinarian, becoming a knight of the Legion of Honour in 1899.

With Abbé Hubert Bourdot, he was co-author of a series of publications (11 parts, 1909 to 1925) involving Hymenomycetes native to France; all parts being published in the Bulletin de la Société Mycologique de France. With Bourdot, he also wrote Heterobasidiae nondum descriptae (Descriptions of a few jelly fungi).

With Bourdot, he was the taxonomic authority of the fungi genus Oxyporus, as well as of numerous mycological species.

References 

1853 births
1925 deaths
People from Aveyron
French mycologists